Shōtarō, Shotaro or Shoutarou (written: 正太郎, 昭太郎, 正太朗, 章太郎, 庄太郎, 祥太郎 or 翔太郎) is a masculine Japanese given name. Notable people with the name include:

, Japanese photographer
, Japanese photographer
, Japanese footballer
, Japanese footballer
, Japanese writer
, Japanese cyclist
, Japanese manga artist
, Japanese photographer
, Japanese voice actor and singer
Shotaro Mamiya (間宮 祥太朗, born 1993), real name Shotaro Mawatari (馬渡祥太朗), Japanese actor
, Japanese K-pop idol in NCT
, Japanese writer

See also
7594 Shotaro, a main-belt asteroid
Shōta
Shotacon

Japanese masculine given names